Belardi Auto Racing was an American racing team in the Indy Lights series. The team was owned by Brian Belardi, who competed in SCCA. Belardi was previously located in Illinois before moving to Brownsburg, Indiana.

Indy Lights

2011-2013
Jorge Goncalvez, Anders Krohn, and Jacob Wilson drove for the team during the 2011 Indy Lights season. Alon Day joined the team for the 2012 Indy Lights season and became the first racer from Israel in the United States. Peter Dempsey joined the team during the 2012 Indy Lights season and remained with the team into the 2013 Indy Lights season Belardi Auto Racing won its first race at the 2013 Firestone Freedom 100 with Peter Dempsey making a four wide pass at the finish line. It was the closest oval configuration finish in Indianapolis Motor Speedway history. The team was forced to let go of Peter Dempsey before the final two races of 2013 due to a lack of sponsorship. Juan Pablo Garcia replaced Peter Dempsey, joining Jorge Goncalvez and Giancarlo Serenelli.

2014
For the 2014 Indy Lights season, Belardi hired drivers Alexandre Baron and Gabby Chaves. Belardi won the 2014 Freedom 100 with driver Gabby Chaves. Chase Austin fractured his wrist in an accident while driving for Belardi in the 2014 Freedom 100. Chaves also won at the Toyota Grand Prix of Long Beach Long Beach 100, Barber Motorsports Park Legacy Indy Lights 100 race 2, and Pocono 100. Alexandre Baron missed the Pocono race but won at Honda Indy Toronto. Baron was replaced by Axcil Jefferies at the Mid-Ohio double-header and Ryan Phinny for Sonoma. Gabby Chaves won the 2014 Indy Lights championship over Jack Harvey at Sonoma in a tiebreaker.

2015
For the 2015 Indy Lights season, Belardi hired drivers Juan Piedrahita and Felix Serralles. Serralles won at Milwaukee with teammate Piedrahita finishing third. Serralles finished seventh and Piedrahita eighth in the final standings.

2016
For the 2016 Indy Lights season, Belardi hired drivers Felix Rosenqvist and Zach Veach. Both drivers suffered car issues during race one at the Indy Lights Grand Prix of St. Petersburg. Rosenqvist won race two at the Indy Lights Grand Prix of St. Petersburg with teammate Veach finishing third. He would miss both Road America and Iowa due to racing in Europe, and was replaced by James French at Road America. Zach Veach won the pole and race one at Road America, leading all 20 laps. Rosenqvist in his return would win both races at Toronto, and then left the team due to his Formula E obligations. Veach would start from fifth, take the lead on the first lap, and win Watkins Glen. Pre-race, Veach's car suffered from clutch and starter issues. Veach would start from fourth, take the lead on the first lap, and also win at the Grand Prix of Monterey (Sunday), the final race of the season.

2017
For the 2017 Indy Lights season, Belardi expanded to three cars, along with hiring drivers Shelby Blackstock, 2016 Pro Mazda Championship winner Aaron Telitz, and Santiago Urrutia. Telitz won the Saturday St. Petersburg race from the pole and Urrutia finished second on Sunday. In April, Belardi and IndyCar Series team Schmidt Peterson Motorsports created a development program for Santiago Urrutia, with his car carrying the Arrow Electronics colors. Chad Boat joined the team for races at Iowa and Gateway, but could not race at Iowa due to medical issues. Urrutia won Mid-Ohio Race 1 from the pole and finished second in Race 2, with Blackstock finishing third in 2. Urrutia won at Gateway, but Belardi drivers including Boat were in several accidents. Telitz won the 2017 season finale at Watkins Glen in wet conditions.

2018
For the 2018 Indy Lights season, Belardi retained driver Aaron Telitz, who at signing had budget concerns. Telitz won the pole for St. Petersburg Race 1, but severely damaged the car qualifying for Race 2, and did not start Race 1. Due to having no backup, Belardi borrowed a car from Carlin, and Telitz wrecked in Race 2. Urrutia won St. Petersburg Race 2. Chris Windom was to race for the team in the Freedom 100, but wrecked his car in testing, and could not compete. Urrutia started from the pole and won Toronto race 2 leading every lap.

2019
For the 2019 Indy Lights season, Belardi hired drivers Zachary Claman DeMelo, Julien Falchero, and Lucas Kohl. Claman DeMelo started from the pole and won St. Petersburg Race 1. Chris Windom joined the team for the Freedom 100, in partnership with Jonathan Byrd's Racing. Aaron Telitz joined the team for the Freedom 100 due to another driver having contract issues. Windom raced as planned in the Freedom 100 despite suffering a serious sprint car accident the day before. He would also have a serious accident in the Freedom 100. Telitz's car suffered issues and not start the race. Telitz would win the pole and race at Toronto Race 1.

2020
Belardi was to compete in the 2020 Indy Lights series, but it was cancelled due to COVID-19. The team closed in November 2020 due to various reasons, including the owner's health. 
Belardi's assets would later be sold to TJ Speed Motorsports.

IndyCar

2018
Belardi joined with A. J. Foyt Enterprises, Hollinger MotorSport (Brad Hollinger), and Jonathan Byrd's Racing to enter driver James Davison in the 2018 Indianapolis 500. Davison wrecked on Fast Friday, but the team repaired the car for Saturday qualifying, and almost didn't make the race. They would qualify 19th for race, but finish 33rd after wrecking in turns 3 and 4 on lap 47 due to car issues.

2019
Belardi joined with Dale Coyne Racing, Hollinger MotorSport (Brad Hollinger), and Jonathan Byrd's Racing to enter driver James Davison in the 2019 Indianapolis 500. Davison qualified 15th, and despite a pit lane accident finished 12th.

2020
Belardi joined with Dale Coyne Racing, Jonathan Byrd's Racing, and Rick Ware Racing to enter driver James Davison in the 2020 Indianapolis 500. Davison qualified 27th, but finished 33rd due to a brake failure and subsequent wheel fire.

Complete Racing Results

Indy Lights
(key)

IndyCar Series
(key)

* Season still in progress

References

External links
 
 

Indy Lights teams
American auto racing teams
IndyCar Series teams
Auto racing teams disestablished in 2020